Afaese Manoa (born 1942 in Tuvalu) is a Tuvaluan writer and musician.

National anthem of Tuvalu
Afaese Manoa is the author of words and music to an anthem, Tuvalu mo te Atua (Tuvalu for the Almighty), in the Tuvaluan language. In 1978, the year of Tuvalu's independence from the United Kingdom, Manoa's anthem lyrics and music were adopted as the national anthem of Tuvalu.

Reputation as writer
Manoa is the best-known writer in a language which has relatively little literature. Along with other Oceanic writers, such as Joanne Gobure of Nauru, his best-known writing evinces a strong sense of religious vocation.

References

External links

 https://web.archive.org/web/20071214001633/http://www.national-anthems.org/anthems/country/TUVALU

1949 births
National anthem writers
Tuvaluan writers
Tuvaluan musicians
Living people
Tuvaluan Christians